Nina Gäßler (born 10 January 1975 in Ulm) is a German mountain biker and rower. And so much more a totally versatile athlete.
In 2005, she moved to Norway, settling in Geilo and worked as a rafting guide. She started mountain bike races in 2006. And has now a successful mountain bike enterprise.

References
 

1975 births
Living people
German female rowers
Sportspeople from Ulm
German mountain bikers
German emigrants to Norway
World Rowing Championships medalists for Germany